The 1993 Matchroom European League was a  professional non-ranking snooker tournament that was played from 3 January to 30 May 1993.

Jimmy White won in the final 10–7 against Alan McManus. 


League phase

Top four qualified for the play-offs. If points were level then most frames won determined their positions. If two players had an identical record then the result in their match determined their positions. If that ended 4–4 then the player who got to four first was higher.

 Steve Davis 6–2 Peter Ebdon
 Jimmy White 5–3 John Parrott
 Steve Davis 5–3 John Parrott
 James Wattana 6–2 Ronnie O'Sullivan
 Steve Davis 5–3 Alan McManus
 Ronnie O'Sullivan 4–4 Jimmy White
 Steve Davis 5–3 Jimmy White

 Alan McManus 7–1 James Wattana
 Jimmy White 5–3 Alan McManus
 James Wattana 4–4 John Parrott
 John Parrott 5–3 Peter Ebdon
 Jimmy White 5–3 James Wattana
 Peter Ebdon 4–4 Ronnie O'Sullivan
 Jimmy White 7–1 Peter Ebdon

 Alan McManus 5–3 Ronnie O'Sullivan
 Ronnie O'Sullivan 4–4 Steve Davis
 Peter Ebdon 4–4 James Wattana
 Steve Davis 7–1 James Wattana
 John Parrott 7–1 Alan McManus
 Peter Ebdon vs. Alan McManus (not played)
 John Parrott 5–3 Ronnie O'Sullivan

Play-offs 
29–30 May (Thornbury Leisure Centre, Bristol, England)

References

Premier League Snooker
1993 in snooker
1993 in British sport